In mathematics, especially in the fields of group theory and representation theory of groups, a class function is a function on a group G that is constant on the conjugacy classes of G. In other words, it is invariant under the conjugation map on G.  Such functions play a basic role in representation theory.

Characters
The character of a linear representation of G over a field K is always a class function with values in K. The class functions form the center of the group ring K[G]. Here a class function f is identified with the element .

Inner products 
The set of class functions of a group G with values in a field K form a K-vector space.  If G is finite and the characteristic of the field does not divide the order of G, then there is an inner product defined on this space defined by  where |G| denotes the order of G.  The set of irreducible characters of G forms an orthogonal basis, and if K is a splitting field for G, for instance if K is algebraically closed, then the irreducible characters form an orthonormal basis.

In the case of a compact group and K = C the field of complex numbers, the notion of Haar measure allows one to replace the finite sum above with an integral: 

When K is the real numbers or the complex numbers, the inner product is a non-degenerate Hermitian bilinear form.

See also
Brauer's theorem on induced characters

References 
 Jean-Pierre Serre, Linear representations of finite groups, Graduate Texts in Mathematics 42, Springer-Verlag, Berlin, 1977.

Group theory